Tis the Season may refer to:

Music
 'Tis the season", lyrics from the 1862 Christmas carol "Deck the Halls"
 'Tis the SeaSon, a 2016 album by Jimmy Buffett
 Tis the Season (Vince Gill and Olivia Newton-John album) (2000)
 Tis the Season (Wendy Moten album) (2009)
 Tis the Season (Jordan Smith album) (2016)

Other uses
 Tis the Season (novel), a 2007 children's novel from the Main Street series by Ann M. Martin

See also
 Christmas and holiday season
 'Tis the Damn Season", a 2020 song by Taylor Swift from Evermore
 'Tis the Season for Los Straitjackets!, a 2002 album by Los Straitjackets
 'Tis the Season to Be Fearless, a 2010 compilation album by Fearless Records
 Tis the Season to Be Smurfy", a 1987 episode of The Smurfs